was a JR East railway station located in Ōfunato, Iwate Prefecture, Japan. The station, as well as most of the structures in the surrounding area, was destroyed by the 2011 Tōhoku earthquake and tsunami and has now been replaced by a provisional bus rapid transit line.

Lines
Hosoura Station was served by the Ōfunato Line, and was located 97.1 rail kilometers from the terminus of the line at Ichinoseki Station.

Station layout
Hosoura Station had a single side platform serving traffic in both directions.  The station was unattended.

History
Hosoura Station opened on 15 December 1933. The station was absorbed into the JR East network upon the privatization of the Japan National Railways (JNR) on April 1, 1987. The station was one of six stations on the Ōfunato Line destroyed by the 11 March 2011 Tōhoku earthquake and tsunami.

Surrounding area
  National Route 45
Goishi Coast
Hosoura Port

External links

 JR East Station information 

Railway stations in Iwate Prefecture
Ōfunato Line
Railway stations in Japan opened in 1933
Railway stations closed in 2011